Whorl is the fourth studio album by Simian Mobile Disco, which was released on 9 September 2014 through Anti-.

Track listing
"Redshift" – 3:52
"Dandelion Spheres" – 3:33
"Sun Dogs" – 7:28
"Hypnick Jerk" – 6:02
"Dervish" – 5:49
"Z Space" – 4:36
"Nazard" – 5:12
"Calyx" – 7:19
"Jam Side Up" – 5:36
"Tangents" – 6:34
"Iron Henge" – 5:25
"Casiopeia" – 3:12

Charts

References

2014 albums
Anti- (record label) albums
Simian Mobile Disco albums